María del Pilar Bardem Muñoz (14 March 1939 – 17 July 2021) was a Spanish film and television actress. In 1996, she won the Goya Award for Best Supporting Actress for her role in Nobody Will Speak of Us When We're Dead. She was the mother of Carlos, Mónica, and Javier Bardem.

Career

She earned her debut in a feature film with a performance in Fernando Fernán Gómez's El mundo sigue (1965). She was a regular in the television series Compuesta y sin novio (1994), Hermanas (1998), El Inquilino (2004), and Amar en tiempos revueltos (2005–2007).

Bardem was the recipient of the Goya Award for Best Supporting Actress, the Premios ACE for Best Supporting Actress, the Valladolid International Film Festival Award for Best Actress, and two Spanish Actors Union Awards for her performances.

Activism
Pilar Bardem was often called "La Bardem", and was well known in Spain not only as an actress, but for her outspoken left-wing political views, particularly close to the party United Left. During the dictatorship of Francisco Franco she remained close to the clandestine Communist Party.

She toiled for "labor rights for actors, civil rights for women", and "a more liberal Catholic Church" (she affirmed a belief that women should be able to become priests). Bardem identified her long struggle, working several jobs at once to raise her children, as not uncommon. She was just "one of so many".

In 2003 Bardem opposed the Spanish government's decision to send troops to Iraq together with other Spanish actors. On 5 February 2003 was invited, among other actors and actresses, to the Congress of Deputies, from which they were evicted after displaying T-shirts and shouting anti-war slogans.

For the 2004 European Parliament election, she was part of the United Left candidacy, but was not elected. 

She was a vocal supporter of the Sahrawi cause. In December 2021, during a homage paid to her at the FiSahara, the Polisario delegate to Spain announced that she will be posthumously bestowed the Sahrawi citizenship.

In 2017 her children prepared a surprise tribute for her, in which 1,300 artists participated. During that event, and already ill, she expressed her desire to see the Third Spanish Republic proclaimed before her death.

Personal life
Born to performers Rafael Bardem and Matilde Muñoz Sampedro in Seville on 14 March 1939, she was the sister of the renowned film director Juan Antonio Bardem. She dropped out of studies in medicine, and started working as model.

Bardem married José Carlos Encinas Doussinague in October 1961 with whom she had her four children, one of them died shortly after birth: Carlos, Mónica, and Javier Bardem. In her book La Bardem she related that her husband abused her until she got a divorce. Encinas died in December 1995 of leukemia. Afterwards, she had an affair with several actors, among them Agustín González.

She lived in the Retiro district of Madrid and was a big fan of football team FC Barcelona.

Death
A regular smoker, she survived lung cancer. She died in the Clínica Ruber in Madrid on 17 July 2021, aged 82, after suffering from a serious lung disease since 2013. Her body was later cremated in the Madrid town of San Lorenzo de El Escorial.

Selected filmography
 Good Morning, Little Countess (1967)
 The Rebellious Novice (1971)
 Variety (1971)
 The Doubt (1972)
 La descarriada (1973) as Lucila
 Amor e Dedinhos de Pé (1992)
 Entre rojas (1995)
Source:

Awards and nominations

References

External links

1939 births
2021 deaths
Spanish film actresses
Spanish television actresses
People from Seville
Best Supporting Actress Goya Award winners
20th-century Spanish actresses
21st-century Spanish actresses
Pilar